Ursaline Bryant (born November 4, 1947) is an actress who has appeared in several films from the 1970s to 1990s.  
She played starship Captain Tryla Scott in the Star Trek: The Next Generation episode "Conspiracy". She also had a memorable role as a prostitute in The Golden Girls episode "Ladies of the Evening".

External links 

1947 births
Living people
20th-century American actresses
American telenovela actresses
American film actresses
21st-century American women